Nizampur is a town in Jehangira tehsil of Nowshera district in Khyber Pakhtunkhwa. It is located at 33°47'7N 72°1'27E and has an altitude of 329 metres (1082 feet). The area contains reserves of iron ore.

Villages 
The villages in Nizampur are below.

 Mastana
  shams Abad
 Inzari
 Shagai
* Kahi* Kahi
 Tarkhil
 [Khan Kohi]
 Namal Bala
 Namal Payan/Namal Hills
 [Piran Bala]
'''* [Faisal Iffi]
 [Piran Payen]
 Jabbai
 Mandori
 Siavi
 Mama Khel

 [Junghre]
 Shawangi
 Asu Khel
 Gaju Khel
 Nama Payen
 Mir Kalan
 Amiro
 Garro
 [Banda Abdul Karim Baba]
 Maroba

 Qamar mela
 Saratoha
 Gandab
 Hisartang 
 Charpani
 Mandhore
 Jabbi
 Darwazgaye
 Kahu/Nehlab

 piran 
Raja Abad
 Jehangira Tehsil
 Nowshera District

References

Populated places in Nowshera District